An injunction is a legal and equitable remedy in the form of a special court order that compels a party to do or refrain from specific acts. "When a court employs the extraordinary remedy of injunction, it directs the conduct of a party, and does so with the backing of its full coercive powers." A party that fails to comply with an injunction faces criminal or civil penalties, including possible monetary sanctions and even imprisonment. They can also be charged with contempt of court. Counterinjunctions are injunctions that stop or reverse the enforcement of another injunction.

Rationale
The injunction is an equitable remedy, that is, a remedy that originated in the English courts of equity. Like other equitable remedies, it has traditionally been given when a wrong cannot be effectively remedied by an award of money damages. (The doctrine that reflects this is the requirement that an injunction can be given only when there is "no adequate remedy at law.") Injunctions are intended to make whole again someone whose rights have been violated. Nevertheless, when deciding whether to grant an injunction, courts also take into account the interests of non-parties (that is, the public interest). When deciding whether to give an injunction, and deciding what its scope should be, courts give special attention to questions of fairness and good faith. One manifestation of this is that injunctions are subject to equitable defenses, such as laches and unclean hands.

Injunctions are given in many different kinds of cases. They can prohibit future violations of the law, such as trespass to real property, infringement of a patent, or the violation of a constitutional right (e.g., the free exercise of religion). Or they can require the defendant to repair past violations of the law.

An injunction can require someone to do something, like clean up an oil spill or remove a spite fence. Or it can prohibit someone from doing something, like using an illegally obtained trade secret. An injunction that requires conduct is called a "mandatory injunction." An injunction that prohibits conduct is called a "prohibitory injunction." Many injunctions are both—that is, they have both mandatory and prohibitory components, because they require some conduct and forbid other conduct.

When an injunction is given, it can be enforced with equitable enforcement mechanisms such as contempt. It can also be modified or dissolved (upon a proper motion to the court) if circumstances change in the future. These features of the injunction allow a court granting one to manage the behavior of the parties. That is the most important distinction between the injunction and another non-monetary remedy in American law, the declaratory judgment. Another way these two remedies are distinguished is that the declaratory judgment is sometimes available at an earlier point in a dispute than the injunction.

Worldwide

Australia

In the state of New South Wales, a court may grant an apprehended violence order (AVO) to a person who fears violence, harassment, abuse, or stalking. The order prohibits the defendant from assaulting, harassing, threatening, stalking, or intimidating the person seeking the order. Other conditions may be included, such as a prohibition against contacting the person or attempting to find the person online. A court may issue the order if it believes a person has reasonable grounds for their fears or has no reasonable grounds for their fears. Non-compliance may result in the imposition of a fine, imprisonment, or both, and deportation.

Turkey 

Interim injunctions are a provisional form of injunctive relief, which can compel a party to do something (mandatory injunction) or stop it from doing something (prohibitory injunction).

A plaintiff seeking an interim injunction must establish that he is likely to succeed on the merits, that he is likely to suffer severe harm in the absence of preliminary relief, and that an injunction is in the public interest.

In Turkish law, interim injunction is an extraordinary remedy that is never awarded as of right. In each case, courts balance the competing claims of injury and consider the likely hardship on the defendant.

United States

History
Injunctions have been especially important at two moments in American history.

First, in the late nineteenth and early twentieth century, federal courts used injunctions to break strikes by unions. For example, after the United States government successfully used an injunction to outlaw the Pullman boycott in 1894 in In re Debs, employers found that they could obtain federal court injunctions to ban strikes and organizing activities of all kinds by unions. These injunctions were often extremely broad; one injunction issued by a federal court in the 1920s effectively barred the United Mine Workers of America from talking to workers who had signed yellow dog contracts with their employers. Unable to limit what they called "government by injunction" in the courts, labor and its allies persuaded the United States Congress in 1932 to pass the Norris-LaGuardia Act, which imposed so many procedural and substantive limits on the federal courts' power to issue injunctions that it effectively prohibited federal court from issuing injunctions in cases arising out of labor disputes. A number of states followed suit and enacted "Little Norris-LaGuardia Acts" that imposed similar limitations on state courts' powers. The courts have since recognized a limited exception to the Norris-LaGuardia Act's strict limitations in those cases in which a party seeks injunctive relief to enforce the grievance arbitration provisions of a collective bargaining agreement.

Second, injunctions were crucial to the second half of the twentieth century in the desegregation of American schools. Federal courts gave injunctions that carried out the command of Brown v Board of Education to integrate public schools in the United States, and at times courts took over the management of public schools in order to ensure compliance. (An injunction that puts a court in the position of taking over and administering an institution—such as a school, a prison, or a hospital—is often called a "structural injunction".)

Injunctions remain widely used to require government officials to comply with the Constitution, and they are also frequently used in private law disputes about intellectual property, real property, and contracts. Many state and federal statutes, including environmental statutes, civil rights statutes and employment-discrimination statutes, are enforced with injunctions.

Forms
Injunctions in the United States tend to come in three main forms, temporary injunctions, preliminary injunctions and permanent injunctions. For both temporary restraining orders and preliminary injunctions, the goal is usually to preserve the status quo until the court is able to decide the case.

Temporary restraining orders
A special kind of injunction that may be issued before trial is called a "temporary restraining order" or TRO. A TRO may be issued without notice to the other party or a hearing. A TRO will be given only for a short period of time before a court can schedule a hearing at which the restrained person may appear and contest the order. If the TRO is contested, the court must decide whether to issue a preliminary injunction. Temporary restraining orders are often, but not exclusively, given to prevent domestic violence, stalking, sexual assault, or harassment.

Preliminary injunctions
Preliminary injunctions are given before trial. Because they are issued at an early stage, before the court has heard the evidence and made a decision in the case, they are more rarely given. The requirements for a preliminary injunction tend to be the same as for a permanent injunction, with the additional requirement that the party asking for the injunction is likely to succeed on the merits.

Permanent injunctions
Permanent injunctions are issued after trial. Different federal and state courts sometimes have slightly different requirements for obtaining a permanent injunction. The Supreme Court enumerated the traditional four-factor test in eBay Inc. v. MercExchange, L.L.C. as:
 the plaintiff has suffered irreparable injury;
 remedies available at law are inadequate to compensate that injury;
 considering the balance of hardships between the plaintiff and defendant, a remedy in equity is warranted; and
 the public interest would not be disserved by an injunction.

The balance of hardships inquiry is also sometimes called the "undue hardship defense". A stay pending appeal is a mechanism allowing a losing party to delay enforcement of an injunction while appeal is pending after final judgment has been granted by a lower court.

Antitrust

The DOJ and the FTC have investigated patent holders in the United States for seeking preliminary injunctions against accused infringers of standard-essential patents, or patents that the patent holder must license on reasonable and non-discriminatory terms. There is an ongoing debate among legal and economic scholars with major implications for antitrust policy in the United States as well as in other countries over the statutory limits to the patent holder's right to seek and obtain injunctive relief against infringers of standard-essential patents. Citing concerns of the absence of competition facing the patent holder once its technology is locked-in to the standard, some scholars argue that the holder of a standard-essential patent should face antitrust liability when seeking an injunction against an implementer of a standard. Other scholars assert that patent holders are not contractually restrained from pursuing injunctions for standard-essential patent claims and that patent law is already capable of determining whether an injunction against an infringer of standard-essential patents will impose a net cost on consumers, thus obviating the role of antitrust enforcement.

United Kingdom

Interim injunctions
Interim injunctions or interim orders are granted as a means of providing interim relief while a case is being heard, to prevent actions being implemented which potentially may be barred by a final ruling.

Super-injunctions

In England and Wales, injunctions whose existence and details may not be legally reported, in addition to facts or allegations which may not be disclosed, have been issued; they have been informally dubbed "super-injunctions".

An example was the super-injunction raised in September 2009 by Carter-Ruck solicitors on behalf of oil trader Trafigura, prohibiting the reporting of an internal Trafigura report into the 2006 Ivory Coast toxic waste dump scandal. The existence of the super-injunction was revealed only when it was referred to in a parliamentary question that was subsequently circulated on the Internet (parliamentary privilege protects statements by MPs in Parliament which would otherwise be held to be in contempt of court). Before it could be challenged in court, the injunction was varied to permit reporting of the question. By long legal tradition, parliamentary proceedings may be reported without restriction. Parliamentary proceedings are covered by absolute privilege, but the reporting of those proceedings in newspapers is only covered by qualified privilege. Another example of the use of a super-injunction was in a libel case in which a plaintiff who claimed he was defamed by family members in a dispute over a multimillion-pound family trust obtained anonymity for himself and for his relatives.

Roy Greenslade credits the former editor of The Guardian, Alan Rusbridger, with coining the word "super-injunction" in an article about the Trafigura affair in September 2009.

The term "hyper-injunction" has also been used to describe an injunction similar to a super-injunction but also including an order that the injunction must not be discussed with members of Parliament, journalists, or lawyers. One known hyper-injunction was obtained at the High Court in 2006, preventing its subject from saying that paint used in water tanks on passenger ships can break down and release potentially toxic chemicals. This example became public knowledge in Parliament under parliamentary privilege.

By May 2011, Private Eye claimed to be aware of 53 super-injunctions and anonymised privacy injunctions, though Lord Neuberger's report into the use of super-injunctions revealed that only two super-injunctions had been granted since January 2010. Many media sources were wrongly describing all gagging orders as super-injunctions. The widespread media coverage of super-injunctions led to a drop in numbers after 2011; however four were granted in the first five months of 2015.

European Union

Dynamic Injunction 
Injunctions defined by the European Commission as injunctions which can be issued for instance in cases in which materially the same website becomes available immediately after issuing the injunction with a different IP address or URL and which is drafted in a way that allows to also cover the new IP address or URL without the need for a new judicial procedure to obtain a new injunction.

Live Blocking Injunction 
An injunction described by the European Commission as allowing the repeated blocking of a website every time a live broadcast is in progress. These injunctions are generally used during live sporting events.

See also 

 
 
 
  (Mareva injunction)

References

External links

 On the Difference Between Lawsuit, a Restraining Order, and an Injunction

Equity (law)
Judicial remedies
Judicial legal terminology
Common law legal terminology
Court orders